Milan Jagnešák (born 29 August 1969 in Rabčice) is a Slovak bobsledder who has competed since 1998. Competing in two Winter Olympics, he earned his best finish of 20th twice (2006: four-man, 2010: two-man).

Jagnešák also finish 21st in the four-man event at the FIBT World Championships 2008 in Altenberg, Germany.

References
 
 

1969 births
Bobsledders at the 2002 Winter Olympics
Bobsledders at the 2006 Winter Olympics
Bobsledders at the 2010 Winter Olympics
Bobsledders at the 2014 Winter Olympics
Living people
Olympic bobsledders of Slovakia
Slovak male bobsledders
People from Námestovo District
Sportspeople from the Žilina Region